This is a list of episodes for the television series Three Sheets.

Series overview
The following is an episode list for Three Sheets, an international travelogue/pub-crawl television series. The show began June 18, 2006 on MOJO HD and aired for three seasons. The fourth season aired on FLN. As of early , FLN continues to air rerun episodes from all four seasons.

Season 1

Season 2

Season 3

Season 4

External links 
 
 Zane Lamprey's Twitter page
 Zane Lamprey's official web site

References 

Lists of reality television series episodes